The Kyrgyz Revolution  or Kyrgyzstani Revolution may refer to:
The Tulip Revolution of 2005
The Kyrgyz Revolution of 2010
The Kyrgyz Revolution of 2020